Dimitri Bisoli (born 25 March 1994) is an Italian footballer who plays as midfielder for Italian Serie B side Brescia.

Career
Bisoli began his professional career for Lega Pro Prima Divisione club Prato in 2012. He successively played for Santarcangelo and Fidelis Andria. Following an impressive season with the Apulian club, he was signed on loan by Brescia, with an option to buy.

Successively signed permanently by the Rondinelle, Bisoli established himself as a starter, being a protagonist of the team's promotion to Serie A in 2018–2019. On 25 August 2019, he made his Serie A debut during an away match at Cagliari; on 9 February 2020 he instead scored his first top flight goal, during a home league match against Udinese, ended in a 1–1 draw.

Since the 2020–21 season, following the retirement of Daniele Gastaldello, Bisoli is serving as team captain.

Personal life
He is the son of Italian football manager and former player Pierpaolo Bisoli.

References

External links
 AIC profile (data by football.it) 
 

1994 births
Sportspeople from Cagliari
Footballers from Sardinia
Living people
Italian footballers
Italy youth international footballers
Association football defenders
A.C. Prato players
Santarcangelo Calcio players
S.S. Fidelis Andria 1928 players
Brescia Calcio players
Serie A players
Serie B players
Serie C players